This is a list of defunct airlines of Australia.

See also
 List of airlines of Australia
 List of airports in Australia

References

Further reading

Australia
Airlines
Airlines, defunct